Plan Martha, or el Plan Marta (also known as Martha's Plan, and as Operación Marta) was an informal agreement, signed in 1957, between the Spanish and Australian Governments, designed to bring single, Spanish, Catholic women to Australia as part of Australia's numerous post-World War II immigration initiatives.

The Plan
Due to the lack of a formal diplomatic contact between the two countries, it was an "informal" arrangement. The agreement was facilitated by Monsignor George Crennan the National Director of the Federal Catholic Immigration Committee.

Altogether, the Plan Martha groups "brought about 800 single women to Australia, from 1960 to the end of the scheme [in 1963]".
"The travellers were women who migrated under the belief that they were coming to Australia to work as domestic servants, when in fact they were called on to balance the sexes of the Spanish migrant population. As García explains in his work, the Australian Department of Immigration encouraged male migrants to nominate their single sisters of marriageable age to come to Australia, the purported motive being that some single migrants were even ‘killing themselves because of loneliness and failure to obtain a woman’ (Garcia 2002, p. 104)." — (Ortiz, 2019, p.34.)

The groups
The first Plan Martha group, of 18 young Spanish women, arrived in Melbourne, Victoria, at Melbourne Airport on 10 March 1960.

Seven of the groups arrived in Australia at Melbourne Airport):
 10 March 1960: 18 young women.
 10 June 1960: 23 young women.
 17 December 1960: 23 young women.
 13 March 1961: 60 young women.
 14 June 1961: 57 young women.
 24 June 1961: 64 young women.
 2 February 1963: 60 young women.

Fake news

The Sydney Sun Herald
On Sunday, 3 March 1963, the Sydney Sun-Herald, published an (unattributed "fake news") article, entitled "Nude Girls Picking Grapes" — allegedly sourced from Mildura, Victoria on the previous day — that reported that "five young Spanish women have been working in the nude at a vineyard near here to beat the heat".

According to García (2002, p. 71), "there were heated discussions about [the article] after Spanish chaplain Father Benigno Martin gave mass in Albion St., Sydney".

The Canberra Times
Although not reported in the Victorian press, the article was repeated, with some (very minor) stylistic variations, the next day in The Canberra Times, the newspaper of the nation's capital city (full text at right).

Molnar's Cartoon
The Merbein matter was the subject of one of Molnar's page two editorial cartoons in the Sydney Morning Herald of 6 March 1963.

Spanish Consul-General
Noting his concern for "the good name of the women of Spain", the Sydney Morning Herald of 5 March 1963 reported that the Consul-General for Spain in Australia, Mr. José Luis Díaz, had flown to Mildura.

In the company of two Merbein policemen, inspected a number of vineyards in the district, Mr. Díaz had found that all of the women involved "had worn plenty of clothes in the traditional Spanish manner" at the time in question, and that he was entirely "convinced [that] the report about the nude Spanish women was not true".

See also
 Operation Kangaroo
 Jesus at the home of Martha and Mary

Footnotes

References

 Garcia, Ignacio (2002), Operación Canguro: the Spanish Migration Scheme, 1958-1963, Jamison Center, ACT: Spanish Heritage Foundation.
 Mason, Robert (2018), The Spanish Anarchists of Northern Australia: Revolution in the Sugar Cane Fields, Cardiff : University of Wales Press. 
 Munday, Winifred (1960), "Valentina: Maid from Spain: She's One of the Family Now", The Australian Women's Weekly, (Wednesday, 24 August 1960), p.7.
 Ortiz, Natalia 2019), "Home Sweet Home" and the Myth of Returning Among Spanish Migrants in Australia: An exegesis submitted in fulfilment of the requirements for the degree of Doctor of Creative Arts, Faculty of Arts and Social Sciences, University of Technology Sydney, February 2019.
 Rowland, Noni, "The Lsughing Senoritas", The Australian Women's Weekly, (Wednesday, 16 August 1961), p.6.also see: The Weekly Round, The Australian Women's Weekly, (Wednesday, 18 October 1961), p.2.
 Tao, Kim (2018), The 60th anniversary of the Spanish migration agreement, Australian National Maritime Museum, 6 August 2018.
 Totoricagëna Egurrola, Gloria (2008), Australia : Vasconia and the Lucky Country, Victoria-Gasteiz [Spain]: Eusko Jaurlaritzaren Argitalpen Zerbitzu Nagusia = Servicio Central de Publicaciones del Gobierno Vasco. 
 Expertly Domestic, The Good Neighbour, (Friday, 1 September 1961), pp.4-5.
 Immigration History from Spain to Victoria, Museums Victoria, 2017.
 Migrants Plead for Girls, The (Sydney) Sun-Herald, (Sunday, 14 February 1960), p.23. 
 New Australians Wed Local Girls, The Biz, (Wednesday, 21 November 1956), p.25.
 What People are Doing: Information Letter for Spanish, The Canberra Times, (Tuesday, 20 July 1961), p.5.

Human migration
History of immigration to Australia
Spanish emigrants to Australia
Australia–Spain relations